Liberty Township is one of twelve townships in Porter County, Indiana. As of the 2010 census, its population was 9,319.

History
Liberty Township was organized in 1836.

Cities and towns
The town of Chesterton has grown south from Westchester Township and has incorporated parts of Liberty Township along State Route 49 near the Indiana Toll Road. Otherwise, there are no incorporated communities within the township.

Other locations
Goodrum Junction was a rail junction in the township located east of the intersection of present-day County Road 950 North and Indiana State Road 49. The Goodrum station was the intersection of interurban feeder routes arriving from Valparaiso (the Valparaiso and Northern Railway)  and Chesterton and the terminus of the only constructed section of the Chicago – New York Electric Air Line Railroad. The station connected the line to Gary and LaPorte with passengers from northern and southern portions of Porter County.

The station was also the location of a 300 kilowatt power generation plant that supplied electricity to the railroad. It was named after George C. Goodrum, a significant investor in the railroad.  The plant began operation on July 17, 1911, and was destroyed after it was struck by lightning in 1925. It was rebuilt the next year in a different location.

Education
Liberty Township is served by the Duneland School Corporation. The elementary school is Liberty Elementary, which serves grades K-4.  Liberty Intermediate School serves grades 5 and 6.  Chesterton Middle School serves grades 7 and 8.  Its high school is Chesterton High School which serves grade 9–12.

References

External links
 Indiana Township Association
 United Township Association of Indiana

Townships in Porter County, Indiana
Townships in Indiana